The 1979–80 Thorn EMI Rugby Union County Championship was the 80th edition of England's County Championship rugby union club competition.

Lancashire won their 11th title after defeating Gloucestershire in the final.

First round

Second round

Semi finals

Final

See also
 English rugby union system
 Rugby union in England

References

Rugby Union County Championship
County Championship (rugby union) seasons